USJA Carquefou is a French football team currently playing in Championnat National based in Carquefou, Loire-Atlantique.

History
The club was founded in 1942 as merger of two local clubs, Union Sportive de Carquefou and Jeanne d'Arc de Carquefou, the latter being a sports team whose football section was founded three years earlier.

During the 2007–2008 season, Carquefou had a very successful Coupe de France campaign, reaching the quarter-finals in the competition after having defeated Olympique Marseille in the round of 16 despite the club's amateur status. Carquefou continued successes and promoted to CFA after winning Group G of CFA 2 in 2008–2009 season. Carquefou finally won Group D of CFA and promoted to Championnat National once in 2011–12 season.

Current squad

Reserve squad 
The Reserve team played in the DH Atlantique.

References

External links
Official club website 
STORIE DI COPPA | Coupe de France 2008: U.S. Jeanne d’Arc Carquefou 

 
Association football clubs established in 1942
1942 establishments in France
Football clubs in France
Football clubs in Loire-Atlantique